Ibn-Rushd is a lunar impact crater located to the northwest of the larger crater Cyrillus. To the northwest is the crater Kant and to the north is Mons Penck, a mountain promontory. The crater is somewhat eroded with age, and the southern rim is overlain by a pair of smaller craters named Cyrillus B and C. The crater floor is relatively flat, and lacks a central peak. In 1976 the crater was named after Ibn Rushd (Latinized as Averroes), the 12th-century Muslim polymath from the Islamic Spain, whose many scientific accomplishments included analysis of the lunar surface. Prior to that, it was identified as Cyrillus B.

References

 
 
 
 
 
 
 
 
 
 
 

Impact craters on the Moon